Sarah Louise Whatmore (born 21 September 1981) is an English singer-songwriter, best known for appearing in the first series of the British TV series Pop Idol. Whatmore later went on to launch her own solo career.

Early life
Whatmore was born in Salford and raised in Walkden.

Career

Pop Idol
Sarah Whatmore rose to fame in the first series of the British television show Pop Idol. Simon Fuller signed her to RCA Records including a worldwide management deal with 19 Entertainment.

Music career
In 2002 and 2003 she released two singles "When I Lost You" and "Automatic", respectively, which both reached the Top 20 in the UK Singles Chart. Whatmore was writing for fellow Pop Idol alumni, and spent time working on her debut album, Living Proof.

A third single failed to materialise, and the release of Living Proof was cancelled. Several recordings were leaked over the years, including "Close To Me" and "Don't Let Me Go".

Turning down the opportunity to become a backing singer for Kylie Minogue to concentrate on her own solo career, Whatmore spent the next five years honing her craft. During the years she wrote more than two hundred songs with various collaborators including Greg Fitzgerald and Peter John Vettese. Whatmore continued to record and write for herself as well as other musicians.

In 2008, she came up with an album of new material. The first single was titled "Smile", and was released on 22 September 2008. It contained a sample of Hall & Oates' "Sara Smile". The single included remixes by Bimbo Jones and Vito Benito. The album, Time To Think, was released on 23 March 2009. Her next single from the album was "Undefined".

In 2016 Whatmore started to officially release music again and published 3 tracks throughout the year, Whatmore released her first EP Full Circle on 24 March 2016.

Discography

Studio albums

Extended plays

Singles

References

External links
 
 EUT Interview

1981 births
Living people
People from Walkden
Pop Idol contestants
Music in Salford
Musicians from Manchester
RCA Records artists
19 Recordings artists
English women pop singers
21st-century English women singers
21st-century English singers